Galactic Wrestling: Featuring Ultimate Muscle, known in Japan as , is a PlayStation 2 game produced by Bandai and released in 2004. Galactic Wrestling: Featuring Ultimate Muscle is an expansion of the GameCube game Ultimate Muscle: Legends vs. New Generation, which had been released in Japan on November 22, 2002 and in North America on June 5, 2003. The game itself has an expansion called , released in Japan on February 2, 2006 for the PlayStation Portable.

Reception

Galactic Wrestling: Featuring Ultimate Muscle received "mixed" reviews according to video game review aggregator Metacritic.  In Japan, Famitsu gave it a score of one seven, one six, one seven, and one six, for a total of 26 out of 40.

See also

Kinnikuman characters
Kinnikuman Muscle Grand Prix

References

External links
Kinnikuman Generations from Bandai
Aki Corporation

Kinnikuman games
Bandai games
Professional wrestling games
PlayStation 2 games
PlayStation 2-only games
2004 video games
Multiplayer video games
Syn Sophia games
Video games developed in Japan